Liga de Ascenso (Promotion League) is the second division of Honduran football; it was founded on 17 December 1979 as Segunda División (Second Division) and renamed Liga de Ascenso (Promotion League) on 21 July 2002. The league is divided into 4 groups: Zona Norte y Atlántica (North and Atlantic Zone), Zona Norte y Occidente (North and West Zone), Zona Centro y Sur (Central and South Zone), Zona Sur y Oriente (South and East Zone). The top 2 teams of each group qualifies for the liguilla (play-offs). Each season is divided into two tournaments, apertura (opening) and clausura (closing). The champion of the opening and closing tournament, compete for the promotion to  Liga Nacional de Fútbol de Honduras in a two-legged match.

Two teams are relegated to Liga Mayor de Futbol de Honduras. The last team of each group face off in a playoff (North vs North and South vs South).

History
From 1965 to 1979 the system of promotion to the Liga Nacional was ruled by the Extra-scholastic Sporting Federation of Honduras(Federación Deportiva Extraescolar de Honduras). It was played in amateur form and the champion of the Central, Southern, and Oriental zone would play against the champion of the North Western zone. The Winner was promoted to the Liga Nacional. In the first tournament of the Liga Nacional there wasn't any promoted or relegated since it was a draft tournament.

It was until 1980 when the second division was founded which nowadays it's called Liga Nacional de Ascenso de Honduras (National Promotion League of Honduras).

In that season, the league didn't have any relegated team since the players of the Honduras national football team needed to be in training at full-time. From the year on, the rules have been applied and there have been many promoted and relegated teams.

From 2004 on the league was split into two seasons, apertura (opening) and clausura (closing). Promotion is decided by a two-legged match between apertura and clausura champion. In the case of the same team being champion in both tournaments, promotion is automatic.

In 2006 Hispano was relegated from first division but they bought Valencia's category in the league; this situation has occurred with other teams. In 2002 Victoria were relegated but acquired Honduras Salzburg's spot.

In 2009 Atletico Gualala earned promotion but decided to merge with that year's relegated club, Real Juventud and kept their history. In 2003 Real Maya merged with Patepluma to form Real Patepluma.

2016-17 clubs

Clubs from Zona Litoral Atlántica
Arsenal (Coxen Hole, Islas de la Bahia)
Atlético Boca Junior (Tocoa, Colón)
CARVA (Coyoles Central, Olanchito, Yoro)
Discua Nicolás (El Progreso, Yoro)
Tela F.C. (Tela, Atlántida)
Trujillo FC (Trujillo, Colón)
Victoria (La Ceiba, Atlántida)
Yoro FC (Yoro, Yoro)

Clubs from Zona Occidental
Atlético Esperanzano (La Esperanza, Intibucá)
Atlético Pinares (Nueva Ocotepeque, Ocotepeque)
Deportes Savio (Santa Rosa de Copán, Copán)
Lepaera FC (Lepaera, Lempira)
Olimpia Occidental (La Entrada, Copán)
Real Juventud (Santa Bárbara, Santa Bárbara)
San Juan (Quimistán, Santa Bárbara)
Trinidad FC (Trinidad, Santa Bárbara)

Teams from Zona Norte y Valle de Sula
Atlético Choloma (Choloma, Cortés)
Atlético Limeño (La Lima, Cortés)
Atlético Independiente (Siguatepeque, Comayagua)
Brasilia FC (Río Lindo, Cortés)
Comayagua FC (Comayagua, Comayagua)
Municipal Santa Cruz (Santa Cruz de Yojoa, Cortés)
Parrillas One (San Pedro Sula, Cortés)
Villanueva FC (Villanueva, Cortés)

Teams from Zona Centro, Sur y Oriente
Estrella Roja (Danlí, El Paraiso)
Gimnástico (Tegucigalpa, Francisco Morazán)
Lobos UPN (Tegucigalpa, Francisco Morazán)
Olancho FC (Juticalpa, Olancho)
Valencia (Tegucigalpa, Francisco Morazan)
Valle FC (Nacaome, Valle)
 Atlético Olanchano from (Catacamas, Olancho) were excluded due to failing to register in time

Winners
 From 1966 to present.
 Segunda División (1966–2002).  Liga de Ascenso (2002–).
 Up until 2004, champions were awarded automatic promotion.
 Apertura and Clausura format established since 2004.

Wins by club

Promotion
In 2004 the league format was changed into short tournaments splitting the season into two separate tournaments, apertura (opening) and clausura (closing). Promotion was decided by a two-legged final until 2012, and is now contested in a single match between apertura champion and clausura champion. In the case that a same team is crowned champion both apertura and clausura, promotion is awarded automatically to said team.

Relegation
In the current system, the last team of each group of the region play on a playoff.

References

External links
 Latribunadeportiva.hn – Liga de Ascenso
 La Prensa.hn

 
Ascenso
Honduras